Éabha O'Mahony (born 17 May 2002) is an Irish footballer who plays as a defender for Texas Longhorns and the Republic of Ireland national team.

References

2002 births
Living people
Republic of Ireland women's association footballers
Women's association football defenders
Cork City W.F.C. players
Republic of Ireland women's international footballers
Boston College Eagles women's soccer players
Republic of Ireland women's youth international footballers
Texas Longhorns women's soccer players